Soul on Ice is a memoir and collection of essays by Eldridge Cleaver. Originally written in Folsom State Prison in 1965, and published three years later in 1968, it is Cleaver's best known writing and remains a seminal work in African-American literature. The treatises were first printed in the nationally-circulated monthly Ramparts and became widely read for their illustration and commentary on Black America. Throughout his narrative, Cleaver describes not only his transformation from a marijuana dealer and serial rapist into a convinced Malcolm X adherent and Marxist revolutionary, but also his analogous relationship to the politics of America.

Background 
Eldridge Cleaver was born in Wabbaseka, Arkansas, in 1935, amidst the severe and unrepentant racism of the South. In 1946, his family moved to Watts, California, where, although the racial climate was not as acute, the young Cleaver began delving into petty crime. After a series of arrests throughout his adolescence, in 1954, he was sent to Soledad State Prison for possession of marijuana. Though he was released within two years, later in 1957, he was convicted of sexual assault with intent to murder and was subsequently sent to San Quentin and then onto Folsom.

While imprisoned at Soledad, Cleaver obtained his high school diploma and read the opuses of Thomas Paine, Richard Wright, Lenin, Machiavelli, Karl Marx, Voltaire, Malcolm X, and W. E. B. Du Bois. When he arrived at Folsom, he began to regularly write freely upon the subject of his "social" and physical imprisonment and the events of the era; eight years later his lawyer, Beverly Axelrod, took the compositions to Ramparts and they were immediately published. After his release in December 1966, Cleaver was reporting for the magazine in San Francisco, and in 1968 Soul on Ice was released.

The essays in Soul on Ice are divided in four thematic sections:

 "Letters from Prison", describing Cleaver's experiences with and thoughts on crime and prisons
 "Blood of the Beast", discussing race relations and promoting black liberation ideology
 "Prelude to Love - Three Letters", Two love letters written to Cleaver's attorney, Beverly Axelrod and one written to Cleaver by Axelrod.
 "White Woman, Black Man", on gender relations, black masculinity, and sexuality

The central premise surrounding the book as a whole is the trouble of "identification as a black soul which has been 'colonized'... by an oppressive white society that projects its brief, narrow vision of life as eternal truth." Cleaver uses the informal essays to navigate through the history and present state of America, covering topics such as the murders of Malcolm X and Emmett Till; the race riots and Vietnam War; U.S. Foreign Policy and the American Flag; Muhammad Ali, Martin Luther King Jr. and other "black celebrities;" Richard Wright's Native Son; Islam and Christianity; day-to-day prison life; and the relationship between black men and white women. In the book, Cleaver admitted to raping black girls as a "practice run" before seeking white women as prey, but claims that in jail he had come to consider those acts as inhuman and, inspired by Malcolm X, had repudiated racism. The text also included homophobic criticism of the writings of the black novelist James Baldwin.

Censorship
The book was one of eleven involved in Island Trees School District v. Pico, a 1982 U.S. Supreme Court case. The books were removed from libraries or otherwise restricted by the board of education of the Island Trees Union Free School District in New York.

See also
 Cape Editions

References

External links 
 Guide to the Eldridge Cleaver Papers at The Bancroft Library
 "Cleaver, Eldridge". The Columbia Encyclopedia, Sixth Edition. 2001–07

American memoirs
1968 non-fiction books
Censored books
Prison writings